Kiara Michelle "Kiki" Bosio (born November 3, 1987) is an American former soccer player from Mission Viejo, California. She played as a forward for the Women's Professional Soccer (WPS) club FC Gold Pride and the United States women's national under-23 soccer team.

Bosio played college soccer for Santa Clara Broncos, where she became known for her acrobatic flip throw-ins. While at University she also occasionally turned out for Ajax America Women of the Women's Premier Soccer League (WPSL).

In 2011 Bosio played for Orange County Waves alongside her sister Dani. She scored three goals in nine regular season appearances as the team won the 2011 WPSL Championship.

References

External links

Santa Clara player page
US Soccer player profile
WPS player profile

1987 births
Living people
Santa Clara Broncos women's soccer players
American women's soccer players
Women's association football forwards
American people of Italian descent
Soccer players from California
Women's Professional Soccer players
Orange County Waves players
Ajax America Women players